Claire Marie Annie Lavogez (born 18 June 1994) is a French professional footballer who plays as a midfielder for NWSL club Kansas City Current.

Club career
A midfielder, she joined Lyon on a three-year deal in 2015. Prior to joining Lyon, she played four seasons with Montpellier and had single season spells with FCF Hénin-Beaumont and US Gravelines Foot.

On 20 July 2022, NWSL club Kansas City Current announced the signing of Lavogez on a contract until the end of the 2023 season.

International career
With the French under-20 team, Lavogez played in the 2014 FIFA U-20 Women's World Cup and scored a celebrated goal against Costa Rica. She ended the tournament with 4 goals in 6 games earning her the 2014 FIFA U-20 Women's World Cup Bronze Ball as the third best player in the tournament. Lavogez and France finished in 3rd place, defeating North Korea in the Bronze medal match. October 2014 she made her senior France debut in a 2–0 win over Germany.

In the 2015 FIFA Women's World Cup quarter-final, substitute Lavogez had her crucial penalty saved by Nadine Angerer in France's penalty shootout defeat by Germany. Lavogez also attracted criticism for a "comically bad" dive during regulation time.

Lavogez competed for France at the 2016 Summer Olympics.

Career statistics

International

International goals
As of match played 30 July 2017. Scores and results list France's goal tally first.

Honours

Club
Lyon
Division 1 Féminine: Winner 2015–16, 2016–17
Coupe/Challenge de France: Winner 2015-16, 2015–16
UEFA Women's Champions League: Winner 2015–16, 2016–17

National Team
UEFA Women's Under-19 Championship: Winner 2013
SheBelieves Cup: Winner 2017

References

External links

 
 
 
 
 Claire Lavogez at Montpellier HSC 
 
 
 

1994 births
2015 FIFA Women's World Cup players
Footballers at the 2016 Summer Olympics
France women's youth international footballers
France women's international footballers
French women's footballers
Living people
Montpellier HSC (women) players
Olympic footballers of France
Olympique Lyonnais Féminin players
Sportspeople from Calais
Union Sportive Gravelines Football players
Women's association football midfielders
Division 1 Féminine players
FC Girondins de Bordeaux (women) players
Footballers from Hauts-de-France
FCF Hénin-Beaumont players
UEFA Women's Euro 2017 players
National Women's Soccer League players